Viktor ("Väinö") Muinonen (30 December 1898, in Lappeenranta – 10 June 1978) was a Finnish long-distance runner, who competed for his native country at the 1936 Summer Olympics in Berlin, Germany.

Born in Imatra, Muinonen is best known for winning the gold medal in the men's marathon at the 1938 European Championships in Paris, France.  He set his personal best of 2:33:03 in 1946, at the age of 47.

References
 sports-reference

1898 births
1978 deaths
People from Lappeenranta
People from Viipuri Province (Grand Duchy of Finland)
Finnish male long-distance runners
Athletes (track and field) at the 1936 Summer Olympics
Olympic athletes of Finland
European Athletics Championships medalists
Sportspeople from South Karelia